"Bonski" is a single from Norwegian DJ and electronic music duo Broiler. It was released in Norway on 4 November 2013 for digital download. The song peaked at number 5 on the Norwegian Singles Chart. The song is included on their debut studio album The Beginning (2013).

Music video
A music video to accompany the release of "Bonski" was first released onto YouTube on 8 November 2013 at a total length of three minutes and forty-one seconds.

Track listing

Chart performance

Weekly charts

Release history

References

DJ Broiler songs
Universal Music Group singles
2013 songs
Songs written by Jesper Borgen